Stadion Miejski w Jastrzębiu-Zdroju (English: Municipal Stadium in Jastrzębie-Zdrój) is a football stadium in Jastrzębie-Zdrój, Poland. The stadium is used by the GKS Jastrzębie. The stadium has 6,800 seats; the areas of the stadium without seats are not used.

References

Jastrzębie-Zdrój
Buildings and structures in Jastrzębie-Zdrój
Sport in Jastrzębie-Zdrój
Jastrzębie-Zdrój